Amud Yomi "column [of the] day" or "daily page") is a daily regimen undertaken to study the Babylonian Talmud one amud each day. (Compare with Daf Yomi in which a daf consists of two amud's, one on each side of the page).

Initiation
The idea for calendar-based learning of the Talmud began with Daf Yomi in 1923. 
Many have, however, found it difficult to keep up with the "heavy load" of two pages (or one daf) each day. 
In addition, the pace is considered too fast to delve into the material. 
As such, Amud Yomi was created as a mechanism allowing for the review of all of Talmud, systematically while at a manageable pace.

Process
With 2,711 dappim (plural for daf) in the Talmud, there are over 5400 amudim. (It is not exactly twice the number of dappim, as some tractates will end on the front side of the page.) Most programs schedule some days for review or catch up, typically on Saturday and/or Sunday. As such, programs will cover between five and seven amudim a week. Depending on the schedule, the entire Talmud would be completed in this fashion after 15 to 21 years.
In some cases - such as at Etz Chaim Yeshiva (London) - this pace, relative to Daf Yomi, allows for the major mefarshim to be reviewed alongside the daf, and "shas" may then be completed with commentaries.

See also
List of masechtot, chapters, mishnahs and pages in the Talmud
Other study cycles under

References

External links
amudyomi.com - Amud Yomi Calendar
DafYomi Advancement Forum - study sources and images of each page of the Babylonian Talmud
dafyomi.org - more study resources
Daf Yomi Review - Amud Yomi schedule generator
rabbileff.net - Amud Yomi schedule of Rabbi Zev Leff
amudyomi.blogspot.com - Amud Yomi schedule at the Albert Einstein College of Medicine

Talmud
Jewish education
Rabbinic legal texts and responsa

es:Daf Yomi
fr:Daf Yomi